Geophagini is a tribe of cichlids from the subfamily Cichlinae, the American cichlids. It is the sister taxon to the clade which includes the Cichlasomatini and Heroini. Fishes in the Geophagini are distributed from Panama south to Argentina, it is the most speciose of the seven tribes within the Cichlinae and it is subdivided into three sub-tribes, Acarichthyina, Crenicaratina, and Geophagina which together contain over 200 species. Geophagines show morphological and behavioural specialisations to enable them to sift the substrates within their mouths so that they can separate benthic invertebrates from substrates dominated by sand or silt.

Classification
The Geophagini are classified as follows:

 Subtribe Acarichthyina Kullander, 1998
 Genus Acarichthys C. H. Eigenmann, 1912
 Genus Guianacara Kullander & Nijssen, 1989
 Subtribe Crenicaratina Kullander, 1998
 Genus Biotoecus C. H. Eigenmann & C. H. Kennedy, 1903
 Genus Crenicara Steindachner, 1875
 Genus Crenicichla Heckel, 1840
 Genus Dicrossus Steindachner, 1875
 Genus Teleocichla Kullander, 1988
 Subtribe Geophagina Haseman, 1911
 Genus Apistogramma Regan, 1913
 Genus Apistogrammoides Meinken, 1965
 Genus Biotodoma C. H. Eigenmann & C. H. Kennedy, 1903
 Genus Geophagus Heckel, 1840
 Genus Gymnogeophagus Miranda-Ribeiro, 1918
 Genus Mazarunia Kullander, 1990
 Genus Mikrogeophagus Meulengracht-Madsen, 1968
 Genus Satanoperca Günther, 1862
 Genus Taeniacara G. S. Myers,  1935

References

 
Cichlinae
Fish tribes